Oz is an American prison drama television series set at a fictional men's prison created and principally written by Tom Fontana. It was the first one-hour dramatic television series to be produced by the premium cable network HBO. Oz premiered on July 12, 1997, and ran for six seasons. The series finale aired on February 23, 2003.

Overview
"Oz" is the nickname for the Oswald State Correctional Facility, formerly Oswald State Penitentiary, a fictional level 4 maximum-security state prison in New York.

The nickname "Oz" is also a reference to the classic film The Wizard of Oz (1939), which popularized the phrase, "There's no place like home." In contrast, a poster for the series uses the tagline: "It's no place like home". Moreover, most of the series' story arcs are set in "Emerald City", a wing named after a setting from the fictional Land of Oz in L. Frank Baum's Oz books, first described in The Wonderful Wizard of Oz (1900).

Plot
In this experimental unit of the prison, unit manager Tim McManus emphasizes rehabilitation and learning responsibility during incarceration, rather than carrying out purely punitive measures. Emerald City is an extremely controlled environment, with a carefully managed balance of members from each racial and social group, intended to ease tensions among these various factions. However, almost all of these factions are constantly at war with one another which often results in many prisoners being beaten, raped, or murdered.

Under McManus and Warden Leo Glynn, all inmates in "Em City" struggle to fulfill their own needs. Some fight for power – either over the drug trade or over other inmate factions and individuals. Others, corrections officers and inmates alike, simply want to survive, some long enough to make parole and others just to see the next day. The show's narrator, inmate Augustus Hill, explains the show, and provides context, thematic analysis, and a sense of humor.

Oz chronicles McManus' attempts to keep control over the inmates of Em City. There are many groups of inmates throughout the show, and not everyone within each group survives the show's events. There are the African-American Homeboys (Wangler, Redding, Poet, Keane, Adebisi) and Muslims (Said, Arif, Khan), the Wiseguys (Pancamo, Nappa, Schibetta, Zanghi, Urbano), the Aryan Brotherhood (Schillinger, Robson, Mack), the Latinos of El Norte (Alvarez, Morales, Guerra, Hernandez), the Irish (The O'Reilly brothers, Kirk, Keenan), the Gays (Hanlon, Cramer, Ginzburg), the Bikers (Hoyt, Sands, Burns), the Christians (Cloutier, Coushaine, Cudney) and many other individuals not completely affiliated with one particular group (Rebadow, Busmalis, Keller, Stanislofsky). In contrast to the dangerous criminals, central character Tobias Beecher gives a look at a usually law-abiding man who made one fatal drunk-driving mistake.

Cast and characters

Main actors are credited as "starring" in the opening title sequence, while supporting actors are listed under "also starring". Guest actors are listed in the show's end credits.

Main

Supporting

Episodes

Oz took advantage of the freedoms of premium cable to show elements of coarse language, drug use, violence, frontal nudity, homosexuality, and rape of males, as well as ethnic and religious conflicts that would have been unacceptable to traditional advertiser-supported American broadcast television.

On an episode of Saturday Night Live that Jerry Seinfeld hosted on October 2, 1999, a sketch was produced that showed what life was like for his character of the same name behind bars after being transferred to the Oswald State Correctional Facility sometime after the events of Seinfeld (1989–1998). The roughly four-minute sketch shows the opening credits for the HBO series with clips of Jerry mixed in doing various activities around the prison. The sketch continues and mixes in different story lines from both Oz and Seinfeld and has Jerry interacting with various characters from the show in his typical quick-witted, sarcastic way. Seinfeld's second cousin, Evan Seinfeld, plays Jaz Hoyt in Oz.

Broadcast

Syndication
On April 21, 2009, Variety announced that starting May 31, DirecTV will broadcast all 56 episodes in their original form without commercials and in up-scaled "high definition" on The 101 Network available to all subscribers. The episodes will also be available through DirecTV's On Demand service.

International broadcast history
In Australia, Oz was screened uncensored on Channel "OH" on Optus TV, then free-to-air channel, SBS. This was also the case in Brazil, where it was aired by the SBT Network Corporation, late at night; in Ireland, where the series aired on free-to-air channel TG4 at 11 p.m.; in Israel, where Oz was displayed on the free-to-air commercial Channel 2; in Italy, where it was aired on the free-to-air Italia 1; and in the United Kingdom, where Channel 4 aired the show in a late-night time slot.

In Bosnia and Herzegovina, it was aired on the federal TV station called FTV.
In Canada, Oz aired on the Showcase Channel at Friday 10 p.m. EST.
In Croatia, Estonia, and Slovenia, the show was aired late at night on public, non-commercial, state-owned channels HRT, ETV, and RTV SLO, respectively.
In Denmark, it appeared late at night on the non-commercial public service channel DR1.
In Finland, it broadcast on the free-to-air channel Nelonen (TV4).
In France, the show aired on commercial cable channel 'Serie Club,' also late at night.
In Malaysia, full episodes of Oz aired late at night on ntv7, while the censored version aired during the day.
In the Netherlands, Oz aired on the commercial channel RTL 5.
In New Zealand Oz aired on The Box at 9.30pm on Wednesdays in the early 2000s (decade).
In Norway and Sweden, it aired on the commercial channels ZTV and TV3 late at night.
In Panama, Oz aired on RPC-TV Channel 4 in a late-night hour.
In Portugal, Oz aired late at night on SIC Radical, one of the SIC channels in the cable network.
In Serbia, Oz aired on RTV BK Telecom.
In Spain, the show aired on premium channel Canal+.
In Turkey, Oz was aired on Cine5; DiziMax also aired the re-runs.
In Japan, it aired on SuperChannel (now, Super! Drama TV) from 29 December 2001 to 22 July 2005.

Rights
The series was co-produced by HBO and Rysher Entertainment (who owns the copyright), and the underlying U.S. rights lie with HBO Entertainment and Warner Bros. Entertainment, which has released the entire series on DVD in North America. The international rights were owned originally by Rysher, then Paramount Pictures/Domestic Television after that company acquired Rysher. CBS Studios International currently owns the international TV rights, and Paramount Home Entertainment/CBS DVD owns the international DVD rights.

Reception

Critical reception
Critical reception of Oz was mostly positive. The first season of Oz has been ranked a 70 based on the rating aggregator website Metacritic, indicating generally favorable reviews by critics. Caryn James from The New York Times stated: "Set almost entirely in the prison, a high-tech horror with glass-walled cells, Oz can also be unpleasant to watch, it is so gruesome and claustrophobic. Yet... as the series moves beyond its introductory shock value, it becomes more serious, disturbing and gripping.... The point of Oz, with its depiction of guilty men in torturous circumstances, is never subtle, but it is complicated and strong." Steve Johnson of the Chicago Tribune wrote: "Engaging, often Brutal."

Other reviews were more critical of the series. Frederic Biddle of the Boston Globe said: "A pretentious exercise in cheap thrills, by great talents allowed to run amok." Howard Rosenberg of the Los Angeles Times reported: "Its uniqueness and arresting style don't earn it an unqualified endorsement here, for its first two Fontana-written episodes are absolute downers--there's no light at the end of a tunnel, nor even a tunnel--that offer no central characters to like or pull for...Be forewarned, too, that Oz is flat-out the most violent and graphically sexual series on TV."

Awards and nominations

Oz has had a successful run at many award associations, including, four wins out of sixteen nominations at the ALMA Awards, three wins out if six nominations at the Artios Awards, three wins out of seven nominations at the CableACE Awards, one win out of twenty-two nominations at the Online Film & Television Association Awards, and two wins out of five nomination at the Satellite Awards. It has also received awards at Il Festival Nazionale del Doppiaggio Voci nell'Ombra and the Edgar Awards.

Additional nominations consist of the NAACP Image Awards (seven), a GLAAD Media Award, a Producers Guild of America Award, a Writers Guild of America Award, and although the series has not been the recipient of any major awards, it was however nominated for two Primetime Emmy Awards, for Outstanding Guest Actor in a Drama Series (Charles S. Dutton), and Outstanding Casting for a Series (Alexa L. Fogel).

Home media

VHS & DVD
The first two seasons of Oz were released on VHS in box sets. HBO Home Video has released all six seasons of Oz on DVD in Region 1 and Region 2. The Region 1 releases contain numerous special features including commentaries, deleted scenes and featurettes. The Region 2 releases do not contain any special features.

Soundtrack

Avatar Records released a soundtrack containing East Coast, West Coast, and Southern hip hop on January 9, 2001. It peaked at #1 on the Billboard Soundtrack Charts, #42 on the Billboard 200, and #8 on the Top R&B/Hip-Hop Albums. The soundtrack featured the song "Behind the Walls" recorded by Kurupt & Nate Dogg.

References

Sources
 Season 1, Episode 2, DVD Commentary on "Oz: The Complete First Season."
 Season 2, Episode 5, "Oz: The Complete Second Season."

Further reading

External links

 

 
1990s American crime drama television series
1997 American television series debuts
1990s American LGBT-related drama television series
2000s American crime drama television series
2003 American television series endings
2000s American LGBT-related drama television series
2000s prison television series
American prison television series
English-language television shows
HBO original programming
Rape in television
Serial drama television series
Television series about organized crime
Television series by CBS Studios
Television series by Home Box Office
Television series created by Tom Fontana
Television shows filmed in New York (state)
Television shows set in New York City
1990s prison television series